Umber is the first full-length album by the American post-hardcore band Bitch Magnet. The band had added second guitarist David Gait since their previous year's release, the eight-song EP Star Booty. In 2004 Umber was listed in Mojo's "Lost Albums You Must Own".

Release and reception

Umber was first released in 1989 on LP by Glitterhouse Records with an all yellowish-umber colored cover with the band's name and album title set in a small bold font at its center. The record's 10 tracks were paired with the band's previous eight-song EP, Star Booty, and issued by Communion on cassette and CD that same year.

In 2011, Umber was remastered by Alan Douches and released in a box-set containing with the rest of the band's catalog.

Track listing
All songs written by Bitch Magnet

The 2011 box-set also contains alternate versions "Motor", "Joan of Arc", "Big Pining", "Joyless Street" and "Punch and Judy".

Personnel

Bitch Magnet
Orestes Delatorre – drums
Jon Fine – guitar
David Galt – guitar
Sooyoung Park – bass guitar, vocals

Additional musicians and production
Bitch Magnet – production
Karan Filian – backing vocals on "Big Pining"
Lou Gehrig – backing vocals on "Big Pining"
Mike McMackin – production, recording

References

External links 
 

1989 albums
Bitch Magnet albums